New Hampshire Route 18 is a  state highway in northwestern New Hampshire.  It is a local road serving Franconia, Bethlehem, and Littleton, New Hampshire, which I-93 bypasses.  Its northern extension, Vermont Route 18, continues northward from the Connecticut River to St. Johnsbury, Vermont.  NH 18 closely parallels I-93 for its entire length and has several interchanges with the Interstate highway.

Route description
NH 18 begins as a spur of I-93 (the Franconia Notch Parkway) at the height of land in Franconia Notch. (U.S. Route 3 is overlapped with I-93 on the Parkway.) NH 18 proceeds to the northwest, intersecting NH 141 and NH 142, near its interchange with I-93. In downtown Franconia, NH 18 joins with NH 116 and meets the eastern end of NH 117 before leaving town and crossing into Bethlehem. NH 18 has two interchanges with I-93 in Bethlehem, joining U.S. Route 302 westbound at the second one (US 302 east provides access to downtown). The highway crosses into Littleton, splitting with NH 116 in the center of town. Just west of downtown, US 302 splits from NH 18 as well. (This intersection is signed as the northern terminus of NH 10, although this designation officially ends much further south.) Northwest of town, NH 18 joins NH 135 near another interchange with I-93. The two routes have a direct interchange with I-93 near the Connecticut River at exit 44 (I-93's last exit in New Hampshire). NH 135 splits off NH 18 before it crosses the river into Vermont (along with I-93 to its west) and becomes VT 18.

History
Route 18 was originally part of the Theodore Roosevelt International Highway, a transcontinental auto trail organized in 1919 running from Portland, Oregon, to Portland, Maine, via Ontario. Within New Hampshire, the Roosevelt Highway ran  from  Littleton to Conway using modern New Hampshire Route 18 from the Connecticut River to downtown Littleton, then modern U.S. Route 302 from Littleton to the Maine line.

In 1922, the New England states adopted the New England road marking system, assigning route numbers to the main through routes in the region. The Roosevelt Highway routing in New Hampshire was assigned  New England Route 18. In 1926, the New England road marking system was supplanted by the national United States Numbered Highway System. Route 18 was transferred to state highway systems in Vermont, New Hampshire and Maine.

In 1935, U.S. Route 302 was designated between Montpelier, Vermont and Portland, Maine, utilizing Route 18 east of Littleton to Portland.  As a result, Route 18 was truncated on the overlapped roadways and later extended along other roads to Franconia.

Junction list

Road names along route

NH Route 18 uses the following local road names:

Franconia
Profile Road
Main Street
Bethlehem
Profile Road/Old Franconia Road
Main Street/Dartmouth College Road
Littleton
Bethlehem Road
Cottage Street
Main Street
St. Johnsbury Road

References

External links

018
Transportation in Grafton County, New Hampshire